The Spanish Syndical Organization (OSE), popularly known in Spain as the  (the "Vertical Trade Union"), was the sole legal trade union for most of the Francoist dictatorship. A public-law entity created in 1940, the vertically-structured OSE was a core part of the project for frameworking the Economy and the State in Francoist Spain, following the trend of the new type of "harmonicist" and corporatist understanding of labour relations vouching for worker–employer collaboration developed in totalitarian regimes such as those of Nazi Germany and Fascist Italy in the first half of the 20th century. Up until the early 1950s, it internally worked—at least on a rhetorical basis—according to the discourse of national syndicalism. Previous unions, like the anarchist CNT and the socialist UGT, were outlawed and driven underground, and joining the OSE was mandatory for all employed citizens. It was disbanded in 1977.

History
The OSE was founded in 1940, established in a January 1940 Law of "Syndical Unity", while its structure was developed through a December 1940 law, in which the OSE was defined as subordinated to the (single) party. Its ideological fundamentals date back to the 1938  law.

OSE held its first congress February 27, 1961 – March 4, 1961. The organisation itself claimed to have roots in the trade union activity of the National-Syndicalist Workers Central (CONS), founded in 1935. CONS had been, as a result of the Unification Decree between the Falangists and the Carlists in 1937, fused with the National-Syndicalist Employers Central (CENS) into the National-Syndical Centrals (Centrales Nacional-Sindicalistas). The idea of organising workers, technicians and employers within one "vertical" structure was also integrated in OSE, and the CNS were incorporated into OSE.

At the very beginning of the Francoist State, wages were directly fixed by the state and only later could workers and employers agree upon their wages through this vertical union. This organisation was the practical consequence of the fascist ideal for industrial relations in a corporate state. In it, all the workers, called "producers," and their employers had the right to choose their representatives through elections.

In this organisation, workers and employers supposedly bargained equally. Strikes were forbidden and firing a worker was very expensive and difficult, as the fascism had "bettered capitalism" and had "succeeded in harmonically balancing workers' and employers' interests". In reality, candidates for these elections had to be approved by Francoist Spain and all the process was heavily controlled, as fascism had a very interventionist policy towards the labour market: full employment for men, even at the expense of low wages or inflation, almost no right to work for married women and no unemployment benefits at all.

At the very end of the Francoist State, the sindicato vertical lost its always limited power and illegal trade unions gained force. This led some pragmatic employers to deal with these illegal unions and forsake the "vertical" one. It disappeared in 1977, during the Spanish transition to democracy.

Clandestine PCE presence
The banned Communist Party of Spain (PCE) considered that the "union" was heavily lopsided in favour of capital but was there to stay, and decided to infiltrate it with their candidates in order to achieve practical gains for the workers' conditions. This was the basis for the communist Workers' Commissions.

Leadership

See also
Movimiento Nacional
Minister for Trade Union Relations

References

1940 establishments in Spain
1977 disestablishments in Spain
Francoist Spain
National trade union centers of Spain
National syndicalism
Trade unions established in 1940
Trade unions disestablished in 1977
Fascist trade unions